The 2003 South Australian National Football League (SANFL) Grand Final saw the Central District Bulldogs defeat West Adelaide by 34 points to claim the club's third premiership victory.

The match was played on Sunday 5 October 2003 at Football Park in front of a crowd of 28,199.

References 

SANFL Grand Finals
Sanfl Grand Final, 2003